Léon Van Aken (6 September 1897 – 13 March 1978) was a Belgian racing cyclist. He rode in the 1920 Tour de France.

References

1897 births
1978 deaths
Belgian male cyclists